Ahuva Ozeri (March 3, 1948 – December 13, 2016) was an Israeli singer, songwriter and composer. She released 20 albums over her four-decade career. According to The Times of Israel, she was "a pioneer of Israeli music".

Early life
Ahuva Ozeri was born and grew up in Tel Aviv's Yemenite Quarter to a Jewish family. Her father died when she was four years old; she had seven siblings.

Career
Ozeri started her career as a singer in Israel in the 1960s. Additionally, she was a songwriter and composer. She played the Bulbul tarang, an Indian musical instrument she learned from the drummer of Ravi Shankar. She released her first album, Where is the Soldier?, in 1975. The songs were about the Yom Kippur War. She went on to release 19 more albums in the next four decades. Despite losing her vocal chords to cancer, she continued to release new music, including six new albums. She released the 2008 hit song Sticker Song with Hadag Nahash. Five years later, in 2013, she released her last album, Maalei Demama (Out of Silence) in 2013, in which she wrote and composed songs interpreted by such artists as Berry Sakharof, Ehud Banai, and Chava Alberstein.

Ozeri was the recipient of an award from the Society of Authors, Composers and Music Publishers in Israel (ACUM) in 2008. She was "a founding mother of Mizrahi music" according to Arutz Sheva and "a pioneer of Israeli music" according to The Times of Israel. Uri Barbash, an Israeli filmmaker, did a documentary about her.

Personal life and death
Ozeri was first diagnosed with laryngeal cancer in 2000, when she had surgery. In 2002, she underwent another surgery to remove a tumour. She died of cancer on December 13, 2016 at the Sheba Medical Center in Ramat Gan, Israel, aged 68.

Upon her death, Prime Minister Benjamin Netanyahu called her "a pillar of Mediterranean music in Israel." Additionally, Miri Regev, Israel's Culture and Sports Minister, tweeted, "the crown of a renewed Israeli culture fell today. Ahuva (meaning "beloved" in Hebrew), rest in peace. I assure you, your voice will not be silenced forever." Yuli Edelstein, the Speaker of the Knesset, called her "a unique figure who blended East and West in an amazing way in her melodies and her lyrics", adding "Her dedication to her work despite the challenges is an inspiration. May her memory be for a blessing.”

References

1948 births
2016 deaths
Israeli people of Yemeni-Jewish descent
Musicians from Tel Aviv
20th-century Mizrahi Jews
21st-century Mizrahi Jews
Jewish Israeli musicians
Israeli women singer-songwriters
Israeli women composers
Deaths from laryngeal cancer
Deaths from cancer in Israel
Burials at Kiryat Shaul Cemetery
20th-century Israeli women singers
21st-century Israeli women singers